Rėguliai (formerly) is a village in Kėdainiai district municipality, in Kaunas County, in central Lithuania. According to the 2011 census, the village had a population of 6 people. There are former farms, a water tower.

At the end of the 19th century Rėguliai was a village and zaścianek in Krakės volost, a property of the Daugirdai family.

Demography

References

Villages in Kaunas County
Kėdainiai District Municipality